Riol Chemie GmbH is a German distributor of chemicals, reagents, deactivation agents and others, situated in Lilienthal, Germany. They are suspected of selling precursor chemicals to Russia. They delivered chemicals and laboratory equipment to Chimmed Group  without export permits. It is possible that they have delivered precursor for Novichok. Customs officials conducted a search  at their headquarters on September 30, 2022. A similar search has been made in Southern Germany, e.g. in Konstanz.

References

External links
RIOL Chemie GmbH

Chemical companies of Germany